Mount Noville  is a mountain, 2,410 m, standing between Van Reeth and Robison Glaciers and 4 nautical miles (7 km) east of Mount Bowlin, in the Queen Maud Mountains. Discovered by the geological party under Quin Blackburn of the Byrd Antarctic Expedition, 1933–35, and named by Byrd for George O. Noville, executive officer of the expedition.

Mountains of Marie Byrd Land